The Manus cuckooshrike (Coracina ingens) is a species of bird in the family Campephagidae.  It is found in the Admiralty Islands.  Its natural habitats are subtropical or tropical moist lowland forest, subtropical or tropical mangrove forest, and subtropical or tropical moist montane forest. It was formerly considered a subspecies of the white-bellied cuckooshrike.

References

Jønsson, K.A., R.C.K. Bowie, J.A.A. Nylander, L. Christidis, J.A. Norman, and J. Fjeldså. 2010. Biogeographical history of cuckoo-shrikes (Aves: Passeriformes): transoceanic colonization of Africa from Australo-Papua. Journal of Biogeography 37: 1767–1781.

Manus cuckooshrike
Birds of the Admiralty Islands
Manus cuckooshrike